Travis Rettenmaier and Ken Skupski were the defending champions from the last edition of the tournament in 2009. They chose not to participate this year.
Matthias Bachinger and Simon Stadler defeated Dominik Meffert and Frederik Nielsen 3–6, 7–6(3), [10–7] in the final.

Seeds

Draw

Draw

References
 Doubles Draw

Volkswagen Challenger - Doubles
2011 Doubles